Marentes is one of eleven parishes (administrative divisions) in the municipality of Ibias, within the province and autonomous community of Asturias, in northern Spain.

Villages and hamlets
Busto 
Marcellana 
Marentes 
Villajane

References

Parishes in Ibias